Chinese Destinies (1933) is a collection of essays about China and Chinese lives by Agnes Smedley, a left-wing journalist.  Along with another book called China's Red Army Marches, it was covertly circulated in Kuomintang-ruled China, both in English and in Chinese translations.

References

1933 non-fiction books
Books about China
Essay collections
Books about socialism